The 2021 South American Artistic Gymnastics Championships was held in San Juan, Argentina, from December 10 to 12, 2021. The competition was approved by the International Gymnastics Federation.

Medalists

Participating nations

Medal table

References

South American Artistic Gymnastics Championships, 2021
South American Gymnastics Championships
International gymnastics competitions hosted by Argentina
2021 in Argentine sport